In the mathematical theory of Lie groups, the Chevalley restriction theorem describes functions on a Lie algebra which are invariant under the action of a Lie group in terms of functions on a Cartan subalgebra.

Statement
Chevalley's theorem requires the following notation:

Chevalley's theorem asserts that the restriction of polynomial functions induces an isomorphism
.

Proofs
 gives a proof using properties of representations of highest weight.  give a proof of Chevalley's theorem exploiting the geometric properties of the map .

References

Lie groups
Lie algebras
Representation theory
Algebraic geometry